China National Highway 226 was a planned National Highway in China which would run from Chuxiong City to Mojiang within the Yunnan province. It was planned to have a length of 298 km.

However, it was delegated to provincial highway as it is entirely in Yunnan.

Route and distance

See also
 China National Highways

References

External links
Official website of Ministry of Transport of PRC

227
Transport in Gansu
Transport in Qinghai